San Pedro Zacapa is a municipality in the Honduran department of Santa Bárbara.

Demographics
At the time of the 2013 Honduras census, San Pedro Zacapa municipality had a population of 10,535. Of these, 72.26% were Mestizo, 15.67% White, 11.00% Indigenous (10.81% Lenca), 1.02% Black or Afro-Honduran and 0.05% others.

References

Municipalities of the Santa Bárbara Department, Honduras